Weston Colored School, also known as the Central West Virginia Genealogical & Historical Library and Museum and Frontier School, is a historic one-room school building located at Weston, Lewis County, West Virginia. It was built in 1882, and is a single-story rubbed red brick building on a fieldstone foundation. It originally measured 22 feet by 28 feet, then enlarged in 1928 by 12 feet, 6 inches. It was used as an educational facility for the community's African-American youth until desegregation in 1954. It was subsequently used for storage, then an agricultural classroom for the Lewis County High School, and as a shop for mentally disabled students. It afterwards was used by the Central West Virginia Genealogical & Historical Library and Museum.

It was listed on the National Register of Historic Places in 1993. It is located in the Weston Downtown Residential Historic District, listed in 2005.

References

External links
 Central West Virginia Genealogy and History Library and Museum - operated by the Hacker's Creek Pioneer Descendants

Defunct schools in West Virginia
Former school buildings in the United States
Historically segregated African-American schools in West Virginia
History museums in West Virginia
Libraries on the National Register of Historic Places in West Virginia
Mission Revival architecture in West Virginia
Museums in Lewis County, West Virginia
National Register of Historic Places in Lewis County, West Virginia
One-room schoolhouses in West Virginia
School buildings completed in 1882
Schools in Lewis County, West Virginia
School buildings on the National Register of Historic Places in West Virginia
Spanish Revival architecture in West Virginia
Individually listed contributing properties to historic districts on the National Register in West Virginia